Leoul Neeraio (born 24 November 1959) is an Ethiopian boxer. He competed in the men's featherweight event at the 1980 Summer Olympics.

References

1959 births
Living people
Ethiopian male boxers
Olympic boxers of Ethiopia
Boxers at the 1980 Summer Olympics
Place of birth missing (living people)
Featherweight boxers